This is a list of notable accidents and incidents involving military aircraft grouped by the year in which the accident or incident occurred. Not all of the aircraft were in operation at the time. For more exhaustive lists, see the baaa-acro.com archives or the aviation-safety.net database. Combat losses are not included except for a very few cases denoted by singular circumstances.

Aircraft terminology 
Information on aircraft gives the type, and if available, the serial number of the operator in italics, the constructors number, also known as the manufacturer's serial number (c/n), exterior codes in apostrophes, nicknames (if any) in quotation marks, flight callsign in italics, and operating units.

For this list, the criteria used for a military aircraft will be: any fixed-wing or rotary-wing aircraft that is operated by a governmental organization such as United States Department of Defense or British Armed Forces in either combat or non-combat missions. The aircraft will fall into categories such as fighter, bomber, attack, search and rescue, transport or training.

2000

14 March Indian Air Force trainer crashes near Hyderabad, killing 1 instructor on board. His Trainee survived. Sqn Ldr Vishal Mehta was killed while trying to bail out of the trainer aircraft which developed a technical snag.

8 April A Bell Helicopter and Boeing Rotorcraft Systems manufactured MV-22B Osprey tiltrotor prototype, BuNo 165436, coded 'MX-04', of HMX-1, (Nighthawk 72) rolled over and crashed at Marana Northwest Regional Airport, Marana, Arizona, United States, killing all 19 United States Marines on board.

19 AprilA Rwandan Air Force Antonov An-8, TL-ACM, chartered from Central African Airlines, crashes near Pepa, Democratic Republic of the Congo after engine failure caused by a suspected bird strike. All 24 on board were killed.

 19 JuneA United States Navy F-14A Tomcat of Fleet Replacement Squadron 101 VF-101 crashed during tactical demonstration at NAS JRB Willow Grove, killing the pilot and Radar Intercept Officer

 26 JulyA Royal Jordanian Air Force C-130H Hercules, 348, crashed shortly after takeoff from King Hussein Air Base, Mafraq Governorate, Jordan. Due to mechanical failures which resulted in the death of all 13 crew members on board. It is the second worst aviation accident to happen in Jordan and the deadliest in the Royal Jordanian Air Force history.

25 AugustRoyal Air Force BAE Systems Hawk T.1, XX266, of the Red Arrows demonstration team suffers birdstrike while returning to Exeter from a display at Dartmouth, Devon, ~17 miles (27 km.) SW of Exeter, punching large hole in starboard wing. Aircraft made safe landing at Exeter Airport.

31 AugustThe first Martin-Baker Mk. 16 ejection takes place from a Beechcraft T-6A Texan II this date.

28 SeptemberA US Navy Beechcraft T-34C Turbo-Mentor of VT-10 crashes in a hayfield in Baldwin County near Silverhill, Alabama, killing both crew.

25 OctoberA Russian Air Force Ilyushin Il-18 crashes near Batumi, Georgia killing all 86 people on board.

1 NovemberHellenic Air Force LTV A-7H Corsair II, 159666, of the 345th Mira, crashes near Cape Tainaros, Crete, Greece, pilot survives.

16 November Indian Air Force Mil Mi-8 crashes near Rann of Kutch, killing all 12 people on board.

11 DecemberThe 18th Bell-Boeing MV-22B Osprey, BuNo 165440, of VMMT-204 (US Marine Corps), with only 157.7 flight hours, crashes in a remote wooded area ~10 miles from MCAS New River, Jacksonville, North Carolina, killing all four crew members.

2001
27 January The second Antonov An-70 prototype crashes seconds after departure from Omsk airport following multiple engine failure. All 33 on board survived.

16 FebruaryA Royal New Zealand Air Force Douglas A-4K Skyhawk, NZ6211, from No. 2 Squadron RNZAF crashes near  in New South Wales while practicing maneuvers for an upcoming air show, killing the aircraft's pilot.

3 MarchA United States National Guard Short C-23B+ Sherpa (Shorts 360), 93-1336, of Florida Army National Guard Det. 1, H Company, 171st Aviation Regiment, based at Lakeland Linder International Airport, crashes during heavy rainstorm around 1100 hrs. in Unadilla, Georgia in the United States. All 21 people on board are killed. Aircraft was en route from Hurlburt Field, Florida to NAS Oceana, Virginia with Virginia Beach-based RED HORSE detachment on board who had been training at Hurlburt.

1 April A US Navy Lockheed EP-3E Aries II surveillance aircraft, BuNo 156511, coded 'PR-32', of VQ-1, collided with a Chinese Shenyang J-8IID fighter jet, reported as 81192, and was forced to make an emergency landing at Lingshui air base on Hainan Island, China. The U.S. crew was detained for 10 days; the Chinese fighter pilot, Wang Wei, was reported missing and presumed dead. The Chinese refused to let the Orion be flown out, so it was dismantled and transported on chartered Antonov An-124-100 of Polyot.

4 April A Sudan Air Force Antonov An-24 crashes during a sandstorm in Adar Yeil, Sudan. Of the 30 people on board, 14 were killed; among them, Sudan's deputy defense minister as well as other high-ranking officers.

12 AprilA Magyar Légierő (Hungarian Air Force) Mil Mi-24D, 579, collides with Mil Mi-24V, 715, while performing low-level formation flight over the range near Gyulafirátót, killing the crew of 579. Aircrew of 715 sustained serious injuries but survived.

16 MayA Turkish Air Force CASA CN-235M-100 crashes into a field in Malatya, Turkey killing all 34 on board.

Two other fatal accidents involving Turkish CN-235s occurred in 2001:
 two days later, on 18 May, a Turkish Navy test flight crashed after the pilot lost control after reaching an altitude of just 100 feet, killing all 4 people on board.
 on 19 January a Turkish Air Force flight crashed near Kayseri after entering a spin from which recovery was not possible, killing all 3 people on board

25 May A Swiss Air Force Aérospatiale Alouette III crash near Delsberg Jura after a collision with a cable killing the Pilot and three cross guardians

29 MayThree crew are killed when a Republic of Korea Army Boeing Vertol CH-47D Chinook, of the 301st Aviation Regiment, Icheon, crashes in Seoul, South Korea while installing a torch-shaped sculpture on the Han River Olympic Bridge, built to commemorate the 1988 Olympic Games. The Chinook had just lowered the flame-shaped statuary onto the bridge central tower when its rotors hit the sculpture and then the tower. The front rotor clipped the top of the sculpture and separated from the helicopter which then fell onto the span, breaking in two, with the rear bursting into flame on the bridge and the forward half falling into the river. No other casualties were reported. The bridge had been closed during the installation work. The dead were identified as pilot Chun Hong-yop, co-pilot Nam In-ho and Sgt. 1st Class Kim Woo-soo. Army scuba divers were working to recover the wreckage. Footage of this crash is also widely available on the web.

29 MayA US Navy McDonnell-Douglas F/A-18 crashed near Fort Pierce, Florida, during a ferry flight from NAS Oceana, Virginia, to NAS Key West, Florida. Pilot was killed.

17 JulyAt pilot Maj. Aaron George of the 416th Flight Test Squadron at Edwards Air Force Base, California, and Judson Brohmer of Tehachapi, California, an aerial photographer under contract to the Air Force Flight Test Center, are killed in the crash of an Edwards-based Lockheed Martin F-16B Block 5 Fighting Falcon, 78-0100, while on a test sortie to chase and film the launch of the Miniature Air-Launched Decoy (MALD) from a second F-16, also from the 416th Flight Test Squadron.

12 October A Swiss Air Force Aérospatiale Alouette III crashed again after a collision with a cable in Montana Valais causing the death of all four occupants. it was the second crash after a cable collision within five months in the Swiss Air Force

1 December A Russian military Ilyushin Il-76TD catches fire and crashes near Novaya Inya, Russia killing all 18 on board.

2002
8 JanuaryA Belgian Air Force General Dynamics F-16A crashes during approach at Kleine Brogel Air Base. Pilot ejects safely.

9 January A USMC Lockheed KC-130R, BuNo 160021 of VMGR-352 (RAIDR 04) crashed into mountainous terrain while on a nighttime approach to Shamsi, Pakistan, 270 kilometers southwest of Quetta, Pakistan, killing all seven crew members on board.

17 FebruaryA USMC McDonnell-Douglas F/A-18D Hornet from VMFA-533 crash lands at Twentynine Palms, California. Both aircrew eject but the WSO, while hospitalized, dies from his injuries.

21 FebruaryA Russian Navy Antonov An-26, 07 Red, crashes one mile (1.5 km.) short of runway at Lakhta Airfield, near Archangelsk, northern Russia, during an emergency landing. Of the 20 people on board, 17 were killed.

2 MarchA Grumman F-14B Tomcat, BuNo 162923, of VF-143, 'AG', from the carrier USS John F. Kennedy crashes into the Mediterranean near the Greek island of Crete, killing its pilot. Aircraft was launching from the carrier when the nose gear disintegrated – both crew eject but the pilot was outside the envelope and was killed.

8 March A Grumman F-14A Tomcat, BuNo 158618, of VF-211, based at NAS Oceana, Virginia Beach, Virginia crashes into the Arabian Sea after a failed attempt to land on the carrier USS John C. Stennis. The Navy said both crew members were pulled from the water by a rescue helicopter shortly after the accident. Neither appeared to be seriously injured.

9 MarchA Portuguese Air Force Lockheed Martin F-16 Fighting Falcon crashes in Monte Real, Portugal, while practicing aerobatic maneuvers, killing the pilot.

2 AprilA United States Navy Sikorsky MH-53E Sea Dragon of HM-14 BuNo 163051 crashed on the runway at Bahrain International Airport. All 18 men and woman on board survived with only a few cases of minor injuries.

11 AprilA MiG-27 fighter jet of the Indian Air Force crashes into the village jungles of South Indian state in Karnataka after flying from Goa Air Force Station, Karwar, killing the pilot, Flying Officer Prashant Kumar Mishra.

20 AprilDuring the NAS Point Mugu air show (Point Mugu, California), the pilot and radar intercept officer are killed when their United States Navy McDonnell-Douglas QF-4S+ Phantom II, BuNo 155749, stalls and crashes after pulling away from a diamond formation. Both eject but chutes do not have time to deploy. The Navy report states in part: "The cause of this tragic accident was the failure of the pilot to manage the energy state of the aircraft, and then to recognize a departure from controlled flight at low altitude, and apply the NATOPS recovery techniques." This Phantom II was credited with a MiG-17 kill 10 May 1972 with VF-96.

24 AprilA Belgian Air Force General Dynamics F-16B collides with an Ikarus C42 (regn PH-3G8) at Sellingen. The pilots of the F-16 and the Ikarus C42 are killed. The pilot in the backseat of the F-16 ejects and survives.

 30 AprilA McDonnell Douglas F-15C Eagle, 80-0022, of the 40th Flight Test Squadron, 46th Test Wing, based at Eglin Air Force Base, Florida, crashes in the Gulf of Mexico ~60 miles S of Panama City, Florida, while on a captive flight development test of a new air-to-air missile, killing test pilot Maj. James A. Duricy, assigned to the 40th Test Squadron, 46th Test Wing. His body is never recovered. An Accident Investigation Board determines that the crash was caused by the structural failure of the honeycomb material supporting the leading edge of the port vertical stabilizer during a high-speed test dive. A section of the leading edge, approximately 6 X 3 feet, broke away. "The doomed F-15C was flying at 24,000 feet when part of its tail broke off. Maj. James A. Duricy ejected at 900 mph and was killed. Investigators said the tail had corroded over the years. The fighter had gotten old." A static display F-15 formerly assigned to the 46th Test Wing, was dedicated to Major Duricy at Arnold Air Force Base, Tennessee, on 9 August 2007.

3 May An Indian Air Force Mikoyan-Gurevich MiG-21 pilot ejects after takeoff, with the aircraft crashing into a Jalandhar bank building, killing eight on the ground.

12 MayThe hangar housing Buran OK-1K1 in Kazakhstan collapses, due to poor maintenance. The collapse kills eight workers and destroys the orbiter as well as a mock-up of an Energia carrier rocket.

2 JuneAn Angolan Armed Forces Mil Mi-17 helicopter crashes in poor weather killing 20 of the 25 on board. Among those on board were top military officials that were going to attend a disarmament ceremony by UNITA rebels.

5 JulyU.S. Navy Sikorsky UH-3H Sea King, Desert Duck 744, operated by HC-2, Detachment 2, based out of Bahrain, suffers tail rotor failure while landing aboard the USS Cushing, spins out of control, goes over starboard side. Seven on board get out safely.

27 July A Ukrainian Air Force Sukhoi Su-27UB crashes during the Lviv airshow killing 77 spectators, 28 of them children. 199 were injured. Pilots managed to eject, but the aircraft crashed on spectators watching the airshow from the ground. The aircraft lacked the altitude to escape the crash, and it hit the tribune and fell on the ground. As stated by Ukrainian Defense Ministry, the crash was caused because of engine failure. Pilots & unit commanders later jailed.

7 August A USAF Lockheed MC-130H aircraft, 90-0161 (C/n. 5265), flying from Rafael Hernandez Airport in Aguadilla, Puerto Rico, crashed in Caguas, Puerto Rico, killing the ten crew. Whilst on a training mission flying at low level in bad weather, the aircraft descended below a safe altitude and impacted a mountain at Caguas.

19 August A Russian Air Force Mil Mi-26 helicopter is shot down by Chechen rebels using a portable SAM, probably an Igla, in Khankala, Russia. Of the 152 on board, 118 are killed.

10 September  United States Navy S-3B BuNo 159402 from VS-22 off USS Harry S Truman crashed at night 25 miles south-east of Puerto Rico.  Three crew killed.

3 OctoberUnited States Navy Grumman F-14A-135-GR Tomcat, BuNo 162594, c/n 516, coded AD 136, of VF-101, suffers dual compressor stalls, both engines shut down, during routine training flight, crashing in the Gulf of Mexico on mission out of NAS Key West, Florida. On 5 May 2006, one of this Tomcat's tailfins is discovered on isolated beach W of Cork, Ireland, having floated 4,900 miles (7,900 km.) across the Atlantic. This was the sixteenth and last Tomcat lost by VF-101 during 30 years of operation.

18 OctoberTwo Boeing F/A-18F Super Hornets collide during air combat manoeuvring off the Southern California coast and crash into Pacific 80 mi SW of Monterey, California. All four crew (two Pilots and two WSOs) are killed while flying (KWF).

3 NovemberA McDonnell-Douglas F/A-18C Hornet from VFA-34 failed to return to USS George Washington from a night at sea bombing mission and crashed into Adriatic Sea. Pilot was killed.

12 November A Swiss Air Force PC-7 crashes at Bonaduz after a collision with a cable from the Rhäzuns-Feldis funicular causing the death of both pilots.

2003
6 JanuaryA US Navy F/A-18 Hornet hit an arresting gear box and skidded off the runway at NAS Lemoore, while conducting Field Carrier Landing Practice during a period of heavy fog due resulting in extremely low visibility.

17 January
A US Marine Corps McDonnell-Douglas F/A-18D Hornet crashes into the Pacific Ocean off of MCAS Miramar, California, due to a material failure during a functional check flight with one engine shut down. Both crew eject safely and are recovered.

19 February An Islamic Revolutionary Guard Corps Ilyushin Il-76MD, 15-2280, c/n 0063471155, formerly registered YI-AND, crashes into a mountain in poor weather near Shahdad, Iran. All 18 crew and 284 passengers on board were killed.

20 FebruaryA Pakistan Air Force Fokker F-27-200, 10254, of 12 Squadron, crashes near Kohat, Pakistan when it strikes a ridge at the  level (915 m) AMSL, obscured by clouds. All 17 people on board died, including Air Chief Marshal Mushaf Ali Mir. PAF spokespersons said on 22 May that pilot error was to blame.

No one was killed, but the ship's mission in the Gulf was postponed.

22 MarchDuring the 2003 invasion of Iraq, two Royal Navy Westland Sea King ASaC.7 Airborne early warning (AEW) helicopters, XV650, 'CU-182', and XV704, 'R-186', collide in mid-air five miles (8 km) from their aircraft carrier  while one had been leaving on a mission as the other returned from the same operation. One American exchange pilot on board, a former E-2C Hawkeye pilot formerly from Carrier Airborne Early Warning Squadron One One Five, was killed. It was later revealed that the three main contributory factors noted by the Board of Inquiry coincided with the three main areas of degradation between the older AEW Mk2 and the upgraded ASaC Mk7; all three had been identified and mitigation put in hand, but two cancelled by an unauthorised official and the other rejected by the RN.

22 March RAF Tornado GR4 ZG710 shot down by a US Patriot Missile Battery, killing both crew.  It later emerged that the primary cause (failure to properly integrate IFF) had been identified in 1998 but corrective action rejected.

1 May A Boeing C-32B or Boeing 757-23A, wearing what may or may not have been a U.S. Air Force serial number, 00-9001, c/n 25494/611, and assigned to the 486th Flight Test Squadron, which is known to be an Eglin Air Force Base, Florida, unit, suffers a ~0300 hrs. landing accident at North Auxiliary Airfield, South Carolina, when the nose gear collapses in a heavy landing. Thought to be operated by the United States State Department (a standard deflection for the Central Intelligence Agency and their Special Operations Group (SOG) / Special Activities Division (SAD) in support of Foreign Emergency Support Team (FEST) activities). Air Force spokeswoman Major Linda Pepin said that there were no serious injuries, "There was a crew of 10 on board. Two sustained minor injuries and were treated and released." The nose gear on the plane collapsed and the plane's position on the ground is not parallel to the runway. Major Pepin stated that the incident will be investigated in days to come by an Air Force safety board, "In any case where there's an incident that involves aircraft safety to ensure that whatever happened in this incident we can avoid next time." Pepin said that they don't know how long the aircraft will stay on the runway, "It's really too early to know when it will get it up and moving." North Auxiliary Airfield is used for C-17 Globemaster III training.

26 May A Canadian Armed Forces CF-18 crashed north of CFB Cold Lake during a training exercise. The pilot, who ejected, was killed.

18 AugustA Polish Air Force Sukhoi Su-22M-4K, of 8 ELT, flying at 3000 meter (10,000 ft) altitude, during antiaircraft artillery exercises, is shot down at 1600 hrs. within the confines of the Wicko Morskie range, near Ustka by 2K12 Kub missile. Another account ascribes the downing merely to a "technical malfunction". The pilot, Lt. Col. Andrzej Andrzejewski, safely ejected and alighted in Baltic Sea 21 km from the coast, and – after one-and-half-hour spent in water – picked up by Mil Mi-14PS SAR helicopter from Siemirowice Air Base. Andrzejewski will subsequently perish on 23 January 2008, CASA C-295 crash.

11 SeptemberWhile landing aboard , operating off the Virginia Capes, a McDonnell-Douglas F/A-18D-32-MC Hornet (Lot 13), BuNo 164198, c/n 961/DO63, 'AD 432', of VFA-106, goes off the angle at ~1600 hrs. when the arresting cable parts, pilot ejects and is recovered. The broken cable, whipping back across the deck, injures eleven deck crew, the most serious of which are airlifted to shore medical facilities. Footage: https://www.youtube.com/watch?v=7OxMox2Kdxs

14 SeptemberOpposing Solo Pilot, Capt. Chris R. Stricklin, in Thunderbirds Number 6, a Lockheed Martin F-16C Block 32J Fighting Falcon, 87-0327, misjudges his altitude before beginning a Split-S takeoff maneuver at Mountain Home AFB, Idaho, ejects in ACES II seat 8/10ths of a second before the aircraft impacts the runway. Stricklin survived with no injuries.

18 SeptemberA Tupolev Tu-160, bort number '01', of the 121st regiment, 22 heavy bombers division, on a proving flight out of Engels Air Base after the replacement of one of its four engines, crashes near Stepnoye settlement, Sovetskoye, Saratov oblast, killing the four crew. There were no armaments aboard. Just before the crash the crew reported an engine fire to ground control, after which contact with the pilots was lost. The wreckage of the bomber was found 35 km from its base. No injuries on the ground. The main staff of the air force identified the dead as crew commander, Lt. Col. Yuriy Deyneko, co-pilot Maj. Oleg Fedusenko [the Russian TV channel gave this name as Fedunenko in its 1000 GMT newscast], and the navigators as Maj. Grigoriy Kolchin and Maj. Sergey Sukhorukov. This was the first Blackjack loss in 17 years of operations.

15 NovemberTwo US Army Sikorsky UH-60 Black Hawk helicopters collide near Mosul, Iraq. Twenty-two soldiers were on both aircraft and 17 were killed.

29 NovemberAn Air Force of the Democratic Republic of the Congo Antonov An-26, 9T-TAD, blows out a tire during landing in Boende, Democratic Republic of the Congo, and overruns the runway and crashes into a market square. Of the 24 people on board, 20 are killed and 13 people on the ground die.

9 DecemberTwo Belgian Air Force General Dynamics F-16A collide near Havelange. One pilot ejects safely, the other is killed.

2004
26 FebruaryRepublic of Macedonia Government Beechcraft 200 Super King Air, Z3-BAB, c/n BB-652, crashes into mountains while attempting to land in poor weather at Mostar International Airport, Bosnia – Herzegovina. All 9 aboard killed, including Macedonian President Boris Trajkovski. Pilot error. The two-man crew misinterpreted crucial flight data in stormy weather.

16 MarchA U.S. Air Force Beechcraft 1900 crashes on approach to Tonopah Test Range Airport after the pilot suffers a heart attack.  All five aboard are killed.

23 MarchFirst prototype Boeing X-50A Dragonfly Canard Rotor/Wing crashes at the United States Army Yuma Proving Ground, Yuma, Arizona, during its third hover test flight. It had made its first flight on 4 December 2003.

24 MarchUS Navy McDonnell-Douglas F/A-18C Hornet, of VFA-82, crashes into the Atlantic Ocean near Tybee Island, Georgia. Pilot ejects safely and is rescued.

21 JuneGrumman F-14A Tomcat of the Islamic Republic of Iran Air Force, flown by Capt. Darioush Yavari and Col. Ali Abou Ataa, crashes on approach to Shahid Beheshti Air Base when Yavari, an experienced Northrop F-5 pilot qualifying on the F-14, misjudges his sink rate during a no-flaps landing, undercarriage strikes runway with enough force to flip the Tomcat onto its back, killing both crew. Cause is found to be premature rush to put pilot in the cockpit without completing simulator course. Commanding officer of TFB.8, Gen. Ahmad Mieghani (himself a former F-5 pilot) resigns, but investigative commission reinstates him, recognizing the true source of the problem.

21 JulyTwo US Marine Corps McDonnell-Douglas F/A-18 Hornets of VMFA-134, 3rd Marine Air Wing, based at MCAS Miramar, California, suffer mid-air collision over the Columbia River,  E of Portland, Oregon, shortly after 1430 hrs., killing Marine Reservists Maj. Gary R. Fullerton, 36, of Spartanburg, South Carolina, and Capt. Jeffrey L. Ross, 36, of Old Hickory, Tennessee in F/A-18B, BuNo 162870, 'MF-00', coming down in the river. Maj. Craig Barden, 38, ejects from F/A-18A, BuNo 163097, 'MF-04', landing nearby on a hillside W of Arlington, Oregon, and is taken to Mid-Columbia Medical Center in The Dalles, suffering minor injuries. All three crew eject but only two parachutes open. The fighters were on their way to the Boardman Air Force Range, where the Oregon Air National Guard trains, when they collided, said one spokesman. Another spokesman told the Associated Press that the aircraft were on a low-altitude training exercise.

15 AugustA US Marine Corps CH-53D Sea Stallion lost tail rotor authority on approach to MCAS Futenma on the island of Okinawa. This was due to improper maintenance. The failure to install a cotter pin resulted in vibrations forcing loose a bolt, thus causing separation of the tail boom from the aircraft.  The aircraft proceeded to spin out of control striking a college building before hitting the ground and catching fire.  The post maintenance test flight crew of 3 survived the crash with injuries.  .

24 AugustA Venezuelan Air Force Shorts 360 crashes near Maracay, Venezuela, killing all 25 on board.

9 SeptemberA low-flying British Army Westland Lynx AH.9 helicopter, ZE382, of 661 Squadron AAC, 1st Regiment, Army Air Corps, is caught in high-voltage electric wires during an Anglo-Czech joint military training exercise near the village Kuroslepy (near Brno). All six persons on board died.

11 SeptemberA Hellenic Army Boeing-Vertol CH-47SD Chinook, EZ-916, of 4 TEAS, ditches into the Aegean Sea off Mount Athos, Greece around 1056 hrs. killing all 17 on board. Among those killed was Patriarch Peter VII of Alexandria.

14 SeptemberA US Navy McDonnell-Douglas F/A-18C Hornet of VMFA-212 crashes at Manbulloo Station about 10 M SW of RAAF Tindal, Australia, during a day approach to landing. The pilot ejects and is injured.

21 SeptemberA U.S. Army UH-60 Black Hawk crashes on Tallil Air Base in Southern Iraq. All four crew members sustained injuries and were rescued by firefighters from the 407th Air Expeditionary Group and medical personnel from the 407 Expeditionary Medical Squadron.

9 NovemberA U.S. Navy McDonnell-Douglas F/A-18C Hornet crashes 15 miles E of Nellis AFB, Nevada, after in flight fire and becoming uncontrollable shortly after takeoff. Pilot ejects safely.

26 NovemberUnited States Marine Corps Bell-Boeing MV-22B Osprey, BuNo 165838, loses a 20 × 4 inch piece of a prop-rotor blade during test flight in Nova Scotia, Canada, but is able to make safe precautionary landing at CFB Shearwater despite severe airframe vibration. The blade failed after apparently being hit by ice which broke off from another part of the aircraft.

29 NovemberA U.S. Army Sikorsky UH-60L Black Hawk, crashes shortly after taking off from Fort Hood, Texas, when it strikes guy-wires supporting the television antenna of KSWO-TV, near Waco, Texas, killing all seven soldiers aboard. Conditions were foggy and the warning lights on the tower were not lit, in violation of both Federal Communications Commission (FCC) and Federal Aviation Administration (FAA) regulations. Victims included Brigadier General Charles B. Allen of Lawton, Oklahoma; Specialist Richard L. Brown of Stonewall, Louisiana; Chief Warrant Officer Todd T. Christmas of Wagon Mound, New Mexico; Chief Warrant Officer Doug Clapp of Greensboro, North Carolina; Chief Warrant Officer Mark W. Evans of Killeen, Texas; Chief Warrant Officer David H. Garner of Mason City, Iowa; and Colonel James M. Moore of Peabody, Massachusetts.

2 DecemberThe pilot of a Blue Angels McDonnell-Douglas F/A-18 Hornet, BuNo 161956, ejects approximately one mile off Perdido Key, Florida, after reporting mechanical problems and loss of power. Lt. Ted Steelman suffered minor injuries and fully recovered.

10 DecemberTwo Canadian Armed Forces Canadair CT-114 Tutor trainers of 431 Snowbirds Air Demonstration Team, 114064 and 114173, flying as opposing solo '8' and '9' (unclear which was which), collide at the top of a loop during practice over Mossbank Airfield, an abandoned World War II aerodrome. Captain Miles Selby, pilot of '8' was killed instantly, but Captain Chuck Mallet was thrown clear of the wreckage of '9', released his lap belt and pulled his chute release, landing with minor injuries.

20 DecemberLockheed Martin F-22 Raptor,  00-4014, c/n 4014, tailcode 'OT', of the 422d Test and Evaluation Squadron, crashes on takeoff at Nellis Air Force Base, Nevada, prompting the U.S. Air Force to ground most of its other F-22s. The pilot ejected safely from the Lockheed Martin-built jet, which smashed into the runway it was trying to leave at about 1545 hrs. local time and burned.

2005
18 JanuaryDuring a training flight, a United States Air Force Cessna T-37B, 66-8003, Cider 21, of the 89th Flying Training Squadron, 80th Flying Training Wing collides in midair with a civilian Air Tractor AT-502B, registration number N8526M, on a cross-country ferry flight over unpopulated ranch land near Hollister, Oklahoma, USA; both aircraft spiral out of control, 2 aircrew in T-37 eject, 1 suffers minor injuries, pilot and sole occupant of N8526M is killed. Both aircraft were operating under visual flight rules (VFR) at an altitude of 5,000 ft (1,520 m) at ~1128 hrs. in conditions reported as hazy and overcast; the AT-502B pilot had not established radio contact with air traffic control, and his aircraft was not equipped with a transponder, but neither was required for VFR operation in Class [Category] E airspace. The crash is primarily attributed to the failure of the pilots to "see and avoid" conflicting air traffic during VFR flight. Investigators conclude that the aircraft collided at an angle of approximately 100 degrees, and a USAF Aerospace Physiologist determines that the AT-502B's left roll cage/door structure created a blind spot that occluded the T-37B from the AT-502B's pilot's line of sight, but the T-37B's right canopy bow did not produce a blind spot for the T-37B pilots. Contributing factors included the lack of a transponder and radios on the AT-502B and the reduced visibility due to haze. Additionally, the USAF report notes that the AT-502B was flying at an inappropriate altitude for its compass heading, as visual flight rules called for cruise flight at an odd or even altitude plus 500 ft (152 m); however, given the pilot's high level of VFR experience, USAF investigators surmise that he was transitioning to a proper altitude at the time, but this hypothesis cannot be confirmed. This accident is a rare example of a midair collision in daylight VFR conditions during cruise flight distant from an airport.

26 January A United States Marine Corps Sikorsky CH-53E Super Stallion helicopter ferrying troops crashes during a sandstorm near Ar Rutba, Iraq killing all 31 on board.

29 JanuaryA Boeing F/A-18 Super Hornet crashes into ocean while landing on USS Kitty Hawk (CV 63). The No. 3 arresting wire snapped, resulting in the aircraft plunging into the Pacific Ocean 100 miles SE of Yokosuka, Japan, hitting an SH-60F and an EA-6B Prowler en route to the water. Crew LTJG Jon Vanbragt, LCDR Markus Gudmundsson ejected safely.

31 JanuaryA Colombian government Sikorsky UH-60 Black Hawk helicopter on an anti-narcotics mission crashes in heavy fog near Manguipayan, Colombia killing all 20 on board.

31 MarchA Lockheed MC-130H Combat Talon II, USAF 87-0127, c/n 5118, Wrath 11, of the 7th Special Operations Squadron, 352d Special Operations Group, RAF Mildenhall, departs Tirana-Rinas Airport, Albania, for a night training mission to work on terrain-following and avoidance skills, airdrops and landing using night-vision goggles. The airplane was not able to clear the ridge and stalled as the crew attempted to climb away. The aircraft struck the ridge, destroying the aircraft and killing all nine crew members on board.

2 AprilRoyal Australian Navy Westland Sea King Mk.50a, N16-100, '(9)02', helicopter Shark 02 of 817 Squadron RAN crashes on the Indonesian island of Nias while providing humanitarian support following the 2005 Nias–Simeulue earthquake, killing 9 Australian Defence Force personnel on board.

18 AprilA United States Air Force Lockheed Martin F-16DJ Block 50D Fighting Falcon, 91-0469, c/n CD-24, of the 55th Fighter Squadron, 20th Fighter Wing, based at Shaw AFB, South Carolina, crashed in a marsh next to the Ashley River near Charleston, South Carolina, 5 NM SE of Charleston AFB. The two crew members, Maj. Steve Granger and Lt. Col. Maurice Salcedo, both assigned to Ninth Air Force Stan Eval and flying with the 55th Fighter Squadron ejected safely. Both the main power and backup power failed moments before the crash, the pilot said.

18 JulyA Boeing F/A-18E Super Hornet and a Boeing F/A-18F Super Hornet from NAS Lemoore, California, collide over the China Lake, California, weapons testing ground. The pilot of the E is KWF, while the two crew of F eject with injuries.

15 AugustA US Navy Grumman C-2A Greyhound, BuNo 162178, c/n 58, of VAW-120, makes successful belly landing at Chambers Field, Naval Air Station Norfolk, Virginia, after undercarriage refuses to extend. Aircraft had departed Norfolk for NAS Pensacola, Florida, when problems were detected. Aircraft circled for two hours to burn fuel before making successful landing. None of 25 on board were injured. Airframe struck off charge with Class A damage, as damaged beyond repair.

5 SeptemberSukhoi Su-33 landing on the Russian aircraft carrier Admiral Kuznetsov at 1627 hrs. gets the trap, but arresting wire breaks and the fighter goes off the deck into the North Atlantic, pilot Sub Colonel Yuri Korneev ejecting immediately. Jet sinks in ~1,000 metres of water, pilot deploys raft from his survival pack and is rescued by a Kamov Ka-27P rescue helicopter and brought on board in a "normal condition." According to a source in Naval Headquarters, "it is possible that the pilot also made a mistake during the incident. The jet pilot, according to instructions, should have revved the engine after the cable broke and performed an emergency take-off. However, the fault of the pilot can be determined only after analysis from the Su-33’s black box," reported Kommersant. Capt. Of First Rank Igor Dygalo, head of the press center of the Main Staff of the Navy, said that the black box released as it was designed and surfaced after the aircraft sank. This was the first loss of the type during a "sea flight."

9 SeptemberA Belgian Air Force General Dynamics/SABCA F-16A Block 20 MLU Fighting Falcon, FA-112, ex-87-0056, c/n 6H-112, of 1 Squadron, 2 Wing, crashes at the Vliehors Shooting Range. The pilot, Cdt. Fabrice Massaux, does not eject and is KWF. The Belgian four-ship formation was practising strafe runs over the Vliehors range in the Netherlands when one of the F-16s crashed at around 1055 hrs. local. The pilot was part of the 1st Squadron, based at Florennes AB in Belgium. Pilot found shortly after the crash by Dutch rescue crews. The Belgian Ministry of Defense sends a team of specialists to the accident scene by Sea King helicopter to investigate the cause of the crash. A bird strike was suspected cause.

15 SeptemberRussian Air Force Sukhoi Su-27 Flanker of the 6th Air Force, 177th Fighter Regiment, during a flight between St. Petersburg and Kaliningrad, for unknown reasons veers off its course while travelling over neutral waters of the Baltic Sea, enters Lithuanian airspace and crashes in Jurbarkas region, Lithuania. No one is harmed during the incident, and pilot Maj. Velery Troyanov ejects safely.

6 December An Islamic Republic of Iran Air Force Lockheed C-130E Hercules, 5-8519, crashes into an apartment building in Tehran, Iran. Ninety-four people on board were killed as well as 14 in the building.

2006
3 JanuaryA United States Army Sikorsky Aircraft UH-60 Black Hawk helicopter crashes near Tal Afar, Ninawa Governorate, Iraq. The aircraft, part of a two-Black Hawk helicopter team, was travelling between military bases when the accident occurred, resulting in 12 fatalities.

10 JanuaryA US Navy North American T-39 Sabreliner of VT-86, en route from Chattanooga, Tennessee to NAS Pensacola, Florida, on a low-level navigation training mission, fails to arrive at ≈1500 hrs. as expected. The wreckage is found late 11 January near LaFayette, Georgia. All four personnel on board, a Navy instructor, a Navy student, an Air Force student and a civilian contract pilot, were killed. Their identities were not immediately released.

19 January  A Slovak Air Force Antonov An-24 carrying peace-keepers from Kosovo crashes near Telkibánya, Hungary. Of the 43 people on board, only one survived.

3 AprilA USAF Lockheed C-5B Galaxy, 84-0059, of 436th Airlift Wing/512th Airlift Wing AF Reserve, crashes in a field one mile (1.6 km) short of the runway during landing approach to Dover AFB, Delaware. All 17 on board survive, although three are seriously injured. The cause was found to be aircrew error as the pilots and flight engineers did not properly configure, maneuver and power the aircraft during approach and landing.

10 April
A Kenya Air Force Harbin Y-12 crashed in Marsabit County in Kenya as it approached Marsabit air strip killing 14 passengers, including a number of politicians.

5 MayDuring the Children's Day flight exhibition at Suwon Air Base, South Korea, Capt. Kim Do-hyun of the Republic of Korea Air Force's Black Eagle team is killed when he loses control of his Cessna A-37B Dragonfly.

23 MayA Greek Lockheed Martin F-16C Block 52 Fighting Falcon, 56-0514, c/n 182–3122, of 343 Mira, and Turkish TAI F-16C Block 40 Fighting Falcon, 93-0684, c/n HC-28, of 192 Filo, based at Balikesir, but which took off from Dalaman, collide at ~1300 hrs. local (0600 hrs. ET) over the Aegean Sea as two Greek F-16s intercept a pair of Turkish F-16s escorting an RF-4E Phantom II recce aircraft towards Crete after an alleged airspace violation. After the intercept, the fighters manoeuver in a mock dogfight, but two collide ~12 miles off the coast of the Greek island of Karpathos. The collision was witnessed by an EgyptAir flight that was passing by. The Greek pilot, Flight Lieutenant Konstantinos Iliakis, is presumed dead, but the Turkish pilot, 1st Lieutenant Halil Ibrahim Özdemir, is rescued by a freighter under Panamanian flag, but refuses to board a Greek SAR helicopter. Greek Super Puma and Turkish Cougar SAR helicopters were dispatched to the area.

3 June  A People's Liberation Army Air Force converted KJ-200 (converted from Shaanxi Y-8), Y-8F-600, AWACS crashes in Guangde County in the People's Republic of China. All 40 people on board died.

26 JuneU.S. Navy VFA-122 squadron pilot Brian R. Deforge, 25, dies when his McDonnell-Douglas F/A-18 Hornet collides with another over Fort Hunter Liggett, north of San Luis Obispo, California. The other pilot successfully ejects and survives.

6 JulyIsrael Air Force F-16I tail 489 crashed while taking off from an IDF base in the Negev desert due jets tyre burst on take-off. Crew ejected safely.

13 JulyA Royal Air Force BAE/McDonnell Douglas Harrier II GR.9 crashes after the pilot ejects near Kidlington in Oxfordshire in the United Kingdom.

2 September A Royal Air Force Hawker-Siddeley Nimrod MR.2 reconnaissance aircraft, XV230, crashes near Kandahar, Afghanistan after a fire and explosion caused by a fuel leak. All 14 crew on board are killed.

14 SeptemberA US Air Force Lockheed Martin F-16CJ/D Block 50B Fighting Falcon, 91-0337, of the 22d Fighter Squadron, 52d Fighter Wing, based out of Spangdahlem Air Base, Germany, crashes in the nearby village of Oberkail after a landing gear failure prevents it from making a controlled landing. The pilot, 1st Lt. Trevor Merrell, ejects safely after aiming his aircraft towards a vacant cow pasture, where it crashes, causing no injuries.

17 September A Nigerian Air Force Dornier 228 crashed killing fifteen, including many senior officers.

24 OctoberA Royal Air Force Tornado GR4 from RAF Marham in Norfolk, eastern England, crashed at around 1100 GMT during a routine practice training exercise at RAF Holbeach Bombing Range located in Lincolnshire. The aircraft wreckage scattered across tidal mud flats located on The Wash bombing range. Both airmen ejected from the aircraft and were rescued by two scrambled RAF Westland Sea King helicopters from Wattisham Airfield and RAF Leconfield. The pilot and navigator were flown to Queen Elizabeth Hospital in King's Lynn, their condition was not thought to be life-threatening, but were being assessed as standard procedure and whether or not there had been any stress to their Vertebral column. Bird strike was thought at the time of the incident to have caused the crash, resulting in the aircraft's sudden engine failure.

16 DecemberA Mexican Air Force Antonov An-32B, 3103, of 3 Grupo Aero/EATP 301, crashes into the sea off the coast of Mexico, near Acapulco. The four crew members on board are killed.

18 DecemberThe Lockheed Martin Polecat UAV aircraft crashes due to an "irreversible unintentional failure in the flight termination ground equipment, which caused the aircraft's automatic fail-safe flight termination mode to activate", cited by Lockheed Martin.

2007
24 JanuaryEcuadorian Defence Minister Guadalupe Larriva, her 17-year-old daughter and five army officers are killed when two Aérospatiale SA.342L Gazelle military helicopters, EE-343 and EE-360, of Grupo Aéreo 43, collide near Manta Air Base at 2019 hrs. during night training.

2 FebruaryA HAL Dhruv helicopter, part of the Sarang display team, loses altitude and crashes while practicing for Aero India-2007 at the Yelahanka Air Base near Bangalore, India. The pilot is severely injured, and the co-pilot is killed. The Saarang team continue their planned performance for the airshow.

18 FebruaryA United States Army Boeing-Vertol MH-47E Chinook, 92-00472, of 2-160th Special Operations Aviation Regiment, crashes in southeastern Afghanistan due to a sudden, unexplained loss of power and control killing eight and wounding 14.

 4 AprilHeavy rain caused the crash of a Força Aérea Brasileira EMBRAER Super Tucano near Boa Vista International Airport, the pilot, Fernando Wilmers de Medeiros, did not survive. 3 other Super Tucanos from the same squad were able to make an emergency landing.

12 AprilAn unarmed Panavia Tornado ECR of the German Air Force crashes in a rock face  near Lauterbrunnen, Switzerland, killing the pilot. The weapons system officer ejects and is rescued severely injured from the rock face by a local helicopter rescue team. The crash occurs minutes after refueling in Emmen during an authorized navigation training in the Swiss Alps while returning to Germany from a long-distance flight to Corsica, France.

21 April A United States Navy Blue Angels McDonnell-Douglas F/A-18 Hornet, BuNo 162437, crashes into a residential neighborhood while performing at an airshow in Beaufort, South Carolina, in the United States, killing the pilot. Military investigators blame pilot for his fatal crash. A report obtained by The Associated Press said that Lieutenant Commander Kevin Davis got disoriented and crashed after not properly tensing his abdominal muscles to counter the gravitational forces of a high-speed turn.

27 April  A Russian military Mil Mi-8 transport helicopter crashes near Shatoy, Chechnya in Russia. The incident occurred during the Battle of Shatoy and killed the crew and 17 spetsnaz (Russian special forces) soldiers on board.

1 MayA Dassault Mirage III of the Fuerza Aérea Argentina (Argentine Air Force) crashes at 1110 hrs. at Morón Air Base after making a low pass during a "baptism of fire" day celebration, observing the opening of combat in the 1982 Falklands/Malvinas War. The pilot, Lt. Marcos Peretti, apparently encountered a fogbank after making the pass. He did not eject after steering the aircraft away from populated areas and was killed. Defence Minister Nilda Garré who presided over the main celebration ordered all Mirage aircraft grounded until a full investigation into the accident is completed "The causes of the accident are under investigation", said minister Garré adding that "Mirages are grounded until we determine how the accident happened; the pilot was in contact until a minute before the accident".
6 MayA French Air Force de Havilland Canada DHC-6 Twin Otter transporting Multinational Force and Observers crashes into a truck while making an emergency landing near El-Thamad, Egypt killing all nine people on board.

11 MayA Republic of China Air Force Northrop F-5 crashes onto a building at an army base in Hukou, Hsinchu, Taiwan. The two crew members are killed, as well as two soldiers of the Singapore Army undergoing training at the base. Another nine Singapore Army soldiers are injured, one dies of his injuries 17 days later.

24 MayA Fuerza Aérea del Perú (Peruvian Air Force) de Havilland Canada DHC-6-300 Twin Otter, FAP-303, c/n 483, crashes in dense jungle after taking off from Pampa Hermosa, Peru. Of the 20 people on board, 13 were killed.

13 JuneA Mongolian People's Army Mil Mi-8 helicopter crashes in Selenge Province, Mongolia while en route to a forest fire killing 15 of the 22 people on board.

30 July FA-18C from VFA-195 crashed after the pilot inadvertently ejected while on emergency night approach to USS Kitty Hawk (CV 63). The aircraft continued to fly for nearly 20 minutes before crashing into the sea 400 miles SE of Guam. The pilot was safely recovered.

5 AugustAn Air Wing of the Armed Forces of Malta Scottish Aviation Bulldog AS0020 stalled and crashed in Dwejra, Gozo. The stalling was probably a result of a sudden microburst. The aircraft cartwheeled upon impact, and hit its nose, wing and tail before coming to a stop upside down. The cockpit slid open and the plane's engine got dislodged upon impact. The cartwheel led to a loss of momentum which probably saved the crew's lives. The two crew members, Mark Brincat and Kevin Borg, only had minor injuries and were treated for shock at St. Luke's Hospital after being airlifted.

8 August A Royal Air Force Aérospatiale-Westland Puma HC.1, ZA934, 'BZ', of 33 Squadron, crashes in a wooded area of Hudswell Grange, W of Catterick Garrison, North Yorkshire, UK. Two RAF crew, pilot and aircraft commander Flt. Lt. David Oxer Hanson Sale, and crewman Sgt. Phillip Anthony "Taff" Burfoot died in the crash, while Army Pvt. Sean Tait, Royal Regiment of Scotland, died two days later in hospital. Nine others injured but survive.

15 AugustLts. Ryan Betton, Cameron Hall and Jerry Smith were killed when their Grumman E-2C Hawkeye, BuNo 163696, 'AD', from Carrier Airborne Early Warning Squadron 120 (VAW-120), based at the Naval Station Norfolk, Virginia, crashed in the Atlantic Ocean off North Carolina at ~2300 hrs. An investigation was unable to determine the cause of the crash, according to a copy of the Judge Advocate General final report – known as a JAGMAN – obtained by Navy Times. The aircraft catapulted off the deck of the carrier USS Harry S. Truman and crashed into the water moments later. The carrier never received any emergency radio transmissions or acknowledgment by the mishap crew, according to the report.

30 AugustBoeing B-52H Stratofortress, accidentally loaded with six W80-1 nuclear-armed AGM-129 advanced cruise missiles flies from Minot Air Force Base, North Dakota, to Barksdale AFB in Louisiana, where the unguarded aircraft sits on the tarmac for 10 hours undetected. Officers responsible for the security lapse at Minot are disciplined.

7 SeptemberA Sikorsky MH-53M Pave Low IV, 69-05794, of the 20th Special Operations Squadron, Hurlburt Field, crashes near Duke Field, Eglin Auxiliary Field 3, two are injured.

7 NovemberA Romanian Air Force IAR-330 Puma SOCAT crashes in Argeș County, Romania, killing all three crew members on board.

8 November  A US Army UH-60 Black Hawk, operating from Aviano Air Base, Italy, crashes at 1217 hrs. near the Piave River, killing all seven on board, a mixed crew of Army and Air Force personnel. KWF are Air Force Capt. Cartize Durnham, Staff Sgt. Robert Rogers, Staff Sgt. Mark Spence, Senior Airman Kenneth Hauprich, Army Capt. Christian Skoglund and Chief Warrant Officer Two Davidangelo Alvarez. One year later, on the anniversary of the accident, members of the Aviano Air Base and Santa Lucia di Piave communities joined to unveil a special memorial honoring those U.S. military members who died in the crash and to remember those Italian World War I heroes of Piave.

6 DecemberA French Air Force twin-seat Dassault Rafale aircraft with a single occupant, on a training flight from the Saint-Dizier base, crashes in an uninhabited part of the Neuvic parish in the Corrèze area, with the loss of its pilot.

2008
6 JanuaryA Boeing F/A-18E Super Hornet has a mid air collision with a Boeing F/A-18F Super Hornet over the North Persian Gulf during routine ops from the USS Harry S Truman. One pilot ejects and is recovered.

12 January  A Macedonian Mil Mi-17 transport, VAM-304, crashes near Skopje, Republic of Macedonia, killing all 11 soldiers on board.

15 JanuaryA Lockheed Martin F-16C Block 30J Fighting Falcon, 87-0347, of the 482nd Fighter Wing, Air Force Reserve Command, based at Homestead Air Reserve Base, Florida, crashes in the Gulf of Mexico near Key West at ~1930 hrs. during a training mission. The pilot, Major Peter S. Smith, ejects and is recovered by a U. S. Navy helicopter, transported to a local hospital for examination, and released. A board of officers is appointed to investigate the accident.

22 JanuaryA Pakistan Air Force Cessna T-37 Tweet trainer faced mechanical failure while in first solo flight of Pilot Officer Raja Jahanzeb flying over Topi, Pakistan. Declining ejection orders to prevent loss of life on the ground, he chose to crash land the plane on a campus road of GIK Institute merely avoiding faculty buildings and blew up into pieces on crashing. The crash killed the pilot and a gardener. Raja Jahanzeb was posthumously awarded Tamgha-e-Basalat (Medal of Good Conduct).

23 January A Polish military airplane EADS CASA C-295, '019', c/n S-043, crashed in forested area near Polish city Miroslawiec killing all 20 people aboard – 16 Polish Air Force officers (incl. one general, Gen. Andrzej Andrzejewski, who survived an ejection from a Su-22M-4K on 18 August 2003, and six colonels) and 4 crew.

28 JanuaryA Portuguese Air Force Lockheed Martin F-16B Block 20 MLU Fighting Falcon, 83-1171, crashes in Monte Real, Portugal while performing a test run after going through extensive maintenance. The pilot, Lt. Col. João 'Skipper' Pereira, safely ejects.

1 FebruaryA United States Air Force McDonnell Douglas F-15 Eagle from the 199th Fighter Squadron, 154th Wing of the Hawaii Air National Guard flying on a routine training flight crashes into the Pacific Ocean near Oahu, Hawaii.

13 FebruaryA USMC BAe-McDonnell-Douglas AV-8B Harrier II from VMA-542 crashes at the Open Ground Farms in Carteret County, North Carolina after pilot Capt Ian E. Stephenson fails to readjust his engine nozzles from the hover-stop position, making the aircraft incapable of staying in the air. He is able to safely eject.

20 FebruaryTwo McDonnell-Douglas F-15C Eagles of the 58th Fighter Squadron, 33d Fighter Wing, Eglin AFB, Florida, collide over the Gulf of Mexico ~ S of Tyndall AFB, Florida, killing 1st Lt. Ali Jivanjee. Capt. Tucker Hamilton ejected from the other fighter and survived. Airframes involved were F-15C-26-MC, 79-0075, c/n 0624/C144, and F-15C-32-MC, 81-0043, c/n 0793/C226. Both pilots ejected and one was rescued from the Gulf by the fishing boat Niña, owned by Bart Niquet of Lynn Haven, Florida, which was guided to the pilot by an HC-144A Ocean Sentry aircraft. A 1st SOW AC-130H and an MV-22 Osprey were also diverted to the scene to help search as were five Coast Guard aircraft and two vessels. An HH-60 Jayhawk from Coast Guard Aviation Training Center Mobile lifted the pilot from the fishing boat and evacuated him to the Eglin Hospital. The second pilot was rescued from the Gulf by an HH-60 Jayhawk from CGAS Clearwater and also taken to the Eglin Hospital. One pilot subsequently died several hours later from his injuries. An accident investigation released 25 August 2008 found that the accident was the result of pilot error and not mechanical failure. Both pilots failed to clear their flight paths and anticipate their impending high-aspect, midair impact, according to Brig. Gen. Joseph Reynes, Jr., Air Combat Command's inspector general who led the investigation. This was the first crash involving an Eglin F-15 since a fatal crash on 30 April 2002.

23 February A Northrop-Grumman B-2A Spirit, 89-0127, 'WM', "Spirit of Kansas", of the 393rd Bomb Squadron, 509th Bomb Wing, Whiteman AFB, Missouri, crashed shortly after takeoff from Andersen Air Force Base in Guam. Both pilots ejected from the aircraft before it crashed, the aircraft was destroyed. Moisture in flight sensors caused steep pitch-up and stall to port.

3 MarchAn Iraqi Air Force Mil Mi-17 helicopter crashes in a dust storm near Baiji, Iraq, killing seven members of the IAF, as well as SSgt. Christopher S. Frost, 24, of Waukesha, Wisconsin, a USAF public affairs specialist who deployed to the Multinational Security Transition Command-Iraq from the 377th Air Base Wing at Kirtland AFB, New Mexico.

7 MarchFailure of a brake metering valve causes a Rockwell B-1B Lancer bomber of the 28th Bomb Wing to roll forward into two rescue vehicles after engine shutdown at Andersen AFB, Guam. Damage to the B-1B and the two vehicles totaled $5.8 million. The "Bone" had stopped over at Andersen while transiting home to Ellsworth AFB, South Dakota from the Singapore Air Show and had taken off for home but returned after the crew declared an in-flight emergency. The aircraft stopped at designated spot off the runway to be met by emergency apparatus, but rolled into the vehicles unexpectedly.

14 MarchA Lockheed Martin F-16C Block 25D Fighting Falcon, 84-1273, flown by pilot 2nd Lt. David J. Mitchell, 26, of Amherst, Ohio, crashes during training mission in a remote area three miles (5 km) S of Alamo Lake, Arizona. His body is located in a ravine near the aircraft wreckage. Mitchell, of the Ohio Air National Guard's 180th Fighter Wing at Toledo Express Airport, Swanton, Ohio, was assigned to the 62d Fighter Squadron at Luke AFB, Arizona since November 2007 as a student pilot. He had 237 total flying hours, ~26 in the F-16.

4 AprilA USAF Rockwell B-1B Lancer, 86-0116, of the 28th Bomb Wing, suffers hydraulic failure while taxiing after landing at Al Udeid Air Base, Qatar, veering off runway and catching fire. Four crew evacuate safely but airframe is burnt out after bomb load explodes.

8 AprilAn Antonov An-26 aircraft on a training mission, possibly belonging to Vietnam's 918 Air Transport Regiment, crashed into a field in Thanh Tri District, Hanoi, Vietnam, killing five military pilots. It had taken off from Gia Lam Airport, and crashed on its way back. The cause of the accident was unknown.

21 MayA Serbian Air Force single-seat SOKO J-22 Orao ground attack aircraft flown by Major Tomas Janik crashed near the village of Baranda. The aircraft that crashed was wearing serial 25114 and was operational with the 241 Fighter-Bomber Aviation Squadron, of 98th Air Base Lađevci. The flight went well until 1130 hours local time when pilot Major Janik experienced problems with his aircraft and was forced to eject. The aircraft went down in the vicinity of the village Baranda and was completely destroyed.

13 JuneTwo United States Navy jets collided over the NAS Fallon, Nevada high desert training range, killing a pilot of the McDonnell-Douglas F/A-18C Hornet, based at NAS Oceana, Virginia. Two crew aboard the F-5 Tiger ejected safely and were rescued.

8 JulyThree Airmen of the 319th Special Operations Squadron, 1st Special Operations Wing, avoid serious injury when the leased Pilatus PC-12 they are training in crashes at the end of the runway at Hurlburt Field, Florida, Eglin Auxiliary Field 9, at ~2330 hrs. as they attempt a landing. The initial investigation finds that the turboprop encountered wake turbulence from another aircraft that had landed shortly before the accident. As a precaution, the three crew were taken to the Eglin hospital and released the same afternoon. Hurlburt leases the PC-12 to train Airmen for the U-28A, the Air Force's version of the single-engine utility aircraft, used in combat for intra-theatre support for the special operations forces.

21 JulyA U.S. Air Force Boeing B-52H Stratofortress, 60-0053, "Louisiana Fire", crashed into the Pacific Ocean approximately 25 nautical miles (46 km) northwest of Apra Harbor, Guam, after taking off from Andersen Air Force Base. The aircraft was about to participate in a flyover for the Liberation Day parade in Hagåtña when it crashed at 9:45 AM ChST (2345 UTC), 15 minutes before the parade was scheduled to start. There were no survivors.

30 JulyA U.S. Air Force McDonnell-Douglas F-15D Eagle, 85-0131, crashed on the Nevada Test and Training Range ~ E of Goldfield, Nevada, at ~1130 hrs. The F-15D, of the 65th Aggressor Squadron, 57th Aggressor Training Group, Nellis Air Force Base, was participating in a combat training mission as part of Exercise Red Flag 08–03. Air Force officials identified the pilot who died as Lt. Col. Thomas A. Bouley, commander of the 65th AS at Nellis. A United Kingdom Royal Air Force Tornado F.3 pilot assigned to the USAF's 64th AGRS was with him and was taken to Mike O'Callaghan Federal Hospital at Nellis. The pilot arrived ~1330 hrs. Wednesday, the Air Force said. The pilot was in stable condition and under observation. The Royal Air Force pilot's name was withheld while the investigation into the crash continues.

25 August A Philippine Air Force C130 Hercules transport plane with two pilots and seven crewmembers onboard, crashed into Davao Gulf after takeoff from Davao International Airport. There were no survivors.

24 SeptemberA Serbian Air Force SOKO G-4 Super Galeb basic trainer/light attack jet aircraft with serial number 23736 flown by Lt. Colonel Ištvan Kanas crashed at Batajnica Air Base. Ištvan Kanas (aged 43), pilot of Flight Test Section (Sektor za letna ispitivanja – SLI) unfortunately did not survive the crash. Kanas was a top Serbian test pilot and member of the private aerobatics team and former member of Leteće Zvezde aerobatics team, officials say he was practicing for an upcoming Belgrade 2008 airshow. He was a father of two. This is the second G-4 Super Galeb ever to crash with tragic consequences after 21 years.

1 OctoberTwo Aéronavale Dassault Super Etendards collide and crash into the channel of northeast France, one pilot missing.

9 OctoberA Canadian Armed Forces Canadair CT-114 Tutor crashed into farmland just northwest of CFB Moose Jaw while taking photographs of a formation of Canadian Forces training aircraft, both crew killed.

17 OctoberThe Russian Air Force grounds all its Mikoyan MiG-29s following a crash in Siberia on this date. The fighter came down  from the Domna airfield during a regular training flight. The pilot ejected safely.

20 OctoberA Republic of China Air Force AIDC F-CK-1B Ching-kuo fighter crashed into the Taiwan Strait during a low-level bombing exercise, two pilots missing.

21 OctoberA Republic of China Navy Sikorsky S-70C crashed five miles of the eastern coast of Hualien County, five on board one killed and two missing.

23 OctoberAn Aeronautica Militare Sikorsky HH-3F Pelican helicopter crashed in southern France, eight onboard killed.

5 DecemberA Mikoyan-Gurevich MiG-29 crashed at Chita in the district of Zabaykalsky Krai, Siberia at 0612 hrs. Moscow time, killing the pilot.

8 December A USMC McDonnell-Douglas F/A-18D Hornet, BuNo 164017, crashed into a San Diego neighborhood, University City, coming down two miles (3 km) west of MCAS Miramar, California, just after the Marine pilot, Lieutenant Dan Neubauer, from VMFAT-101, ejected. Four fatalities on the ground. The Hornet was being flown from the USS Abraham Lincoln. The commander of the fighter squadron involved in the crash, its top maintenance officer and two others have been relieved of duty as a result of the crash investigation. The pilot has been grounded pending a further review, Maj. Gen. Randolph Alles announced in March 2009.

2009
12 JanuaryA Sikorsky UH-60L Blackhawk, 91-26321, of the 36th Combat Aviation Brigade, Texas Army National Guard, crashes on the campus at Texas A&M University just after take-off due to tail rotor failure, killing 2nd Lt. Zachary Cook, 2008 Texas A&M graduate, member of the Texas A&M ROTC, and Aggie Corps of Cadets and injuring four other Army personnel. The helicopter was participating in the Rudder's Rangers Annual Winter Field Training.

15 JanuaryAn Afghan National Army Air Corps Mil Mi-17 Hip Helicopter crashes in Herat Province in western Afghanistan. The incident occurred in bad weather and travelling at low-altitude in a mountainous region resulting in 13 fatalities including the Afghan General Fazaludin Sayar.

17 JanuaryA French Army Eurocopter AS 532 Cougar Helicopter crashes into the Atlantic Ocean of the coast of Gabon. The helicopter on a routine exercise was flying from the amphibious assault ship the FS Foudre and the accident occurred shortly after take-off resulting in 2 injured and 8 fatalities from the 13e Régiment de Dragons Parachutistes and the Aviation Légère de l'Armée de Terre.

20 JanuaryTwo Spanish Air Force Dassault Mirage F1 on a training flight, collide in midair. The three pilots were found dead in the debris of the airplanes.

21 JanuaryAn Indian Air Force HAL HJT-16 Kiran Mk.2 military trainer aircraft from the No. 52 Squadron Surya Kiran (Sun Rays) Aerobatics display team based at the Bidar Air Force Station in Karnataka, India crashed into a field during a routine training exercise killing the pilot.

26 JanuaryA United States Army routine night exercise involving two Bell OH-58 Kiowa Helicopter from the 6th Cavalry Regiment based at Fort Drum, New York, collide in mid-air. The accident occurred near the city of Kirkuk Northern Iraq resulting in 4 crew fatalities.

30 JanuaryThe pilots of a Boeing C-17A Globemaster III, 06-0002, "Spirit of the Air Force", of the 16th Airlift Squadron, 437th Airlift Wing, Charleston AFB, South Carolina, distracted by a series of minor problems, neglect to lower the landing gear and belly-land the transport in at Bagram Air Base, Afghanistan after dark. None of the six crew aboard are injured, but damages of $19 million are sustained by the airframe. Pilots are grounded pending a command review of the accident, an Air Mobility Command spokesman said. The automated ground proximity warning system was apparently accidentally turned off. This is the first belly-landing of a C-17 in sixteen years of operation.

9 FebruaryA leased Pilatus U-28A, 06-0692, with three personnel of the 319th Special Operations Squadron, 1st Special Operations Wing on board, based at Hurlburt Field, Florida, makes a gear-up landing at Craig Field (Alabama) at Selma, Alabama (formerly Craig Air Force Base), whilst performing simulated engine failure approach, breaking off nosewheel and causing severe damage to nosewheel strut assembly, propeller and main undercarriage doors. A board of officers will investigate the 1415 hrs. incident in which there were no injuries. This accident has been classified as a Class A accident, indicating that fairly substantial damage was incurred. Aircraft repaired and reported flying again by 29 April 2009.

9 FebruaryA Royal Air Force BAE Systems Harrier T.10 (ZH656) on a routine training exercise from No. 20 Squadron (R) Operational conversion unit based at RAF Wittering crashes on the runway at Royal Air Force Station Akrotiri, Cyprus. The 2 crew ejected safely from the aircraft which was damaged in a fire.

11 FebruaryTwo Grob G 115 Tutor aircraft collided above Porthcawl, South Wales killing four people. The aircraft took off from RAF St Athan shortly before. Among the dead were two female teenage cousins and two instructor pilots.

18 FebruaryA Fuerza Aérea Colombiana Basler BT-67 (Colombian Air force designation: AC-47T) intelligence-gathering aircraft of the Escuadrón de Combate Táctico 113 Avion Fantasma (ghost aircraft) crashed near the Comando Aéreo de Combate No 1 Airbase at Puerto Salgar, Cundinamarca, Colombia. The aircraft was on a training flight resulting in 5 crew fatalities.

27 FebruaryA Polish Army Mil Mi-24 Hind Helicopter crashes in bad weather into a forest near Toruń, Kuyavian-Pomeranian Province, Poland. The aircraft from the 49 Regiment combat helicopters Pruszcz Gdański was on a night training flight for service in Afghanistan resulting in 2 crew injured and 1 fatality.

19 March An Aviación del Ejército Ecuatoriana (Ecuadorian Army Aviation) Beechcraft military aircraft crashes into an apartment building in Quito, Ecuador, killing five on board and two on the ground.

23 MarchA German Air Force Panavia Tornado, 45+37, from Jagdbombergeschwader 33  crashes on the runway at Büchel Air Force Base, Rhineland-Palatinate, Germany. The aircraft, on a routine night training exercise, suffers extensive damage during the incident which occurs in high winds and rain, the two crew ejecting safely.

25 MarchA USAF Lockheed Martin F-22A Raptor, 91-4008, Raptor 07, of the 411th Flight Test Squadron, 412th Test Wing, crashes in the marshy flat land 6 miles N of Harper Dry Lake near Edwards Air Force Base, California, during a weapons integration flight test mission. The single-seater goes down about 1000 hrs. (1300 hrs. ET) for unknown reasons, the officials said. The fighter was on a test mission when it crashed about  NE of Edwards AFB, where it was stationed, the Air Force said in a news release. KWF was David Cooley, 49, a 21-year Air Force veteran who joined Lockheed Martin Corp., the aircraft's principal contractor, in 2003. Cooley, of Palmdale, was pronounced dead at Victor Valley Community Hospital in Victorville, California. An Air Force investigation finds that the accident occurred after the pilot lost consciousness in a high-gravity maneuver. The reports stated that during the third test of the mission the pilot appeared to have been subjected to increased physiological stress and his lack of awareness delayed a recovery maneuver. At 7,486 ft MSL, the pilot initiated ejection outside of the seat design envelope and immediately sustained fatal injuries.

31 MarchA Polish Air Force PZL M28 (Antonov An-28TD Bryza 1TD) crashes into trees on final approach to an airfield near Gdynia, Poland. The aircraft was a routine training flight simulating landing on one engine resulting to 4 crew fatalities.

2 AprilA Spanish Air Force F/A-18 Hornet crashes in northern Spain. Pilot ejects safely.

6 AprilAn Indonesian Air Force Fokker F27 crashed in Bandung, Indonesia killing all 24 occupants on board. The cause of the incident was said to be heavy rain. The aircraft reportedly crashed into a hangar during its landing procedure and killed all on board. The casualties include: 6 crew, an instructor and 17 special forces trainee personnel.

7 AprilA Philippine Air Force Bell 412 helicopter crashes in bad weather in a heavily forested area at Mount Mangingihe, Sitio Tawangan, Kabayan, Benguet, Philippines. The helicopter was travelling from Loakan Airport to Ifugao in the Cordillera Administrative Region in Luzon when it crashed killing the 3 crew and 5 government officials.

10 AprilA Kenyan Airforce Harbin Y-12 crashes into a hillside on approaching an airstrip near Marsabit, Eastern Province, Kenya killing 14 personnel.

14 AprilA Turkish Air Force Lockheed Martin F-16C Fighting Falcon from the 9th Air Wing flying from Balıkesir Airport on a routine night exercise crashes near the village of Muradiye Sarnıç, Balıkesir Province, Turkey killing the pilot.

26 AprilThe third flying prototype of the Sukhoi Su-35, 04 (?), is destroyed during a high-speed taxi test just before its first flight at Dzemgi Airport near Komsomolsk-on-Amur. Aircraft apparently ran off end of runway, hits obstacle, burns, destroying it. Test pilot Eugene Frolov ejects safely and is unhurt. This was actually the fourth prototype, but 03 is purely for ground testing.

30 AprilAn Indian Air Force Sukhoi Su-30MKI crashes in the Pokhran region of Rajasthan after it took off from Pune during its routine sortie, killing one of its two pilots. This was the first crash of the Su-30MKI since its induction in the IAF.

3 MayA Fuerzas Terrestres Venezuela (Venezuelan Army) Mil Mi-17 Hip  helicopter crashes on a border patrol with Colombia with 18 fatalities including the Venezuelan General Domingo Faneite. The accident occurred near the town of El Alto de Rubio, in Táchira state, Venezuela.

 4 MayA Russian Navy Kamov Kamov Ka-27 (Helix) Helicopter landing on the Baltic Fleet Frigate Yaroslav Mudryi, the main-rotor made contact with the ship superstructure, crashed on the deck and then rolled over the side into the sea. The 5 crew from the Kamov helicopter were successfully rescued from the sea.

5 MayA United States Marine Corps Bell AH-1W SuperCobra belonging to HMM-166, based at MCAS Miramar, California, crashes at 1154 hrs. PST into the Cleveland National Forest, California, killing both pilots.

12 MayA South African Air Force Agusta Westland AW109E, helicopter, 4022, crashes at the Woodstock Dam, near Bergville, KwaZulu-Natal, South Africa. The aircraft from No. 17 Squadron SAAF was travelling from Durban International Airport to a satellite base of the 87 Helicopter Flying School SAAF at Dragon's Peak, Drakensberg for a week-long training exercise. Flying with two another aircraft at low level and at high speed over the surface of the Dam, the helicopter struck the water and crashed, then sinking into the lake killing the 3 crew.

14 MayA Royal Air Force BAE Systems Harrier GR9 (ZG478) from No. 1 Squadron based at RAF Cottesmore makes a heavy landing at Kandahar International Airport, Afghanistan due to an engine failure forcing the pilot to successfully eject from the aircraft.

15 MayAn Indian Air Force Mikoyan MiG-27 Flogger  crashed shortly after take-off and the pilot successfully ejected from the aircraft. The accident occurred near the Konkani village, Jodhpur, India and resulted in injuries to 7 local villagers.

15 MayA Fuerza Aérea Colombiana Dassault Mirage 5COAM (FAC-3031) on a routine training flight from the Comando Aéreo de Combate No. 1, crashed shortly after take-off from the Palanquero airbase, Puerto Salgar, Cundinamarca Department, Colombia. The aircraft from the Escuadrón de Combate 112 suffered a technical fault causing a fire which forced the pilot to successfully eject from the aircraft without injury.

19 MayA United States Navy Sikorsky HH-60H Seahawk crashes into the Pacific Ocean  SW of San Diego, California. The aircraft was on a routine training flight and returning to the aircraft carrier USS Nimitz when the accident occurred off of Point Loma, California, killing all 5 members of its crew. Only 3 bodies were recovered.

20 May Indonesian Air Force Lockheed L-100 Hercules A-1325 crashes into the village of Geplak, near Madiun, East Java, killing at least 98 people.

21 MayA US Air Force test pilot student is killed when his Northrop T-38A Talon jet trainer crashes N of Edwards Air Force Base, California, ~ nine miles N of the base, near California City.

26 MayA Força Aérea Brasileira Embraer EMB 110 Bandeirante (C-95) FAB 2332; a twin-engined turboprop transport made a heavy landing at Base Aérea do Campo dos Afonsos, Rio de Janeiro, Brazil. The accident occurred when the landing gear failed to operate.

28 MayA Nigerian Air Force Van's Aircraft RV-6A Air Beetle crashed near Kaduna, Nigeria on a training flight, both occupants killed.

2 JuneA Royal Jordanian Air Force Slingsby T-67 Firefly while on a routine training flight being flown by a cadet pilot and instructor, crashes near the Al-Hassan Industrial Estate, Irbid, Jordan. The pilot, due to a technical fault, was unable to recover from a spin leaving 1 crew dead and 1 injured.

4 JuneA Hellenic Air Force Lockheed Martin F-16C Fighting Falcon, 93-1059, '059', of the 347 Fighter Squadron based at Nea Anchialos Airforce Base crashes near the village of Michalitsi part of the Tzoumerka National Park, Ioannina, Greece. The aircraft flying with another F-16 from the 111th Combat Wing suffered a bird strike and engine failure forced the pilot to successfully eject.

8 JuneAn Indonesian Army locally-built MBB Bo 105 crashes while flying in bad weather near to Situhaing village on West Java, killing all five occupants.

9 JuneAn Indian Air Force Antonov An-32 Cline transport aircraft crashes near a village in West Siang district of Arunachal Pradesh killing 13 defence personnel. The aircraft crashed over the Rinchi Hill above Heyo village, about 30 km from Mechuka advance landing ground in the district located about 60 km from the Indo-Chinese Line of Actual Control. Among the seven IAF men and six Army personnel on board the ill-fated aircraft were two wing commanders, two squadron leaders and a flight lieutenant.

9 JuneA Vietnamese People's Air Force Sukhoi Su-22M3/4 Fitter J/K crashes into a cornfield near Chieng Bay Hill, Thanh Hóa Province, Vietnam killing the pilot. The aircraft from the 923rd Fighter Regiment was on a routine training flight and suffered mechanical failure.

12 JuneAn Indonesian Air Force locally-built Aérospatiale SA 330J Puma crashed at Bogor, West Java during a test flight following maintenance of the helicopter, all four occupants killed.

14 JuneA Royal Air Force Grob Tutor collided with a glider near Abingdon, Oxfordshire, England, killing a reservist pilot and an Air Training Corps cadet. The glider pilot parachuted to safety.

16 JuneTwo Spanish Air Force McDonnell-Douglas F/A-18 Hornets collide in midair near the Canary Islands, Spain. Both pilots eject safely.

17 JuneA Russian Air Force Sukhoi Su-24MR Fencer crashes on landing at the Monchegorsk Airforce Base, Murmansk Oblast, Russia. The aircraft from the 98th Separate Reconnaissance Aviation Regiment suffered a heavy landing forcing the 2 crew to eject safely.

18 JuneAn Indian Air Force Mikoyan MiG-21 Bison from the Chabua Air Force Station, Assam, India crashes due to a technical fault while on a routine training flight, the pilot successfully ejecting from the aircraft.

19 JuneA Russian Air Force Sukhoi Su-24MR Fencer crashes near the village of Kostino-Bystrianská, Rostov-on-Don, Rostov Oblast, Russia. The aircraft from the 1st Composite Air Division, North Caucasus Military District suffered a mechanical fault forcing the 2 crew to eject safely after several aborted landings. The Russian Airforce fleet of Sukhoi Su-24 was grounded for technical inspection after 2 accidents in a week.

22 JuneA United States Army Bell TH-67 Creek crashed near Hartfield, Alabama on a training mission, one of the two occupants killed.

22 JuneA United States Air Force Lockheed Martin F-16CM Fighting Falcon, 89-2108, from the 421st Fighter Squadron, 388th Fighter Wing, based at Hill Air Force Base, Ogden, Utah crashes on a night training flight on the Utah Test and Training Range. The pilot, Capt. George B. Houghton, dies in the crash which occurred  S of Wendover, Utah.

2 JulyA Royal Air Force Panavia Tornado F.3 crashes near the Rest and Be Thankful beauty spot in Glen Kinglass, Arrochar, Scotland. The aircraft was on a routine training flight from No. 43 Squadron RAF Leuchars in Fife resulting in 2 crew killed in the accident. The crew were pilot Kenneth Thompson and weapons systems officer Nigel Morton.

3 JulyA Fuerza Aérea Argentina Dassault Aviation Mirage III from Grupo 6 de Caza based at Tandil Airport, Buenos Aires Province, Argentina crashed into open countryside near Benito Juárez and the pilot successfully ejected from the aircraft.

3 July A Pakistan Army Mil Mi-17 helicopter crashed at Chapar Feroze Khel near Peshawar, Pakistan due to a technical fault resulting in 26 fatalities.

3 JulyA Belgian Air Component Piper L-21B Super Cub crashes on take-off at Goetsenhoven Military Airfield, Flanders, Belgium killing the 2 crew. The aircraft which was used as a glider-tug collided with a nearby hangar, crashing into a field and caught fire.

7 JulyA Serbian Air Force MiG-29 crashes while performing aerobatic manoeuvres in preparation for an upcoming airshow, killing the pilot Lt. Col. Rade Randjelovic and a soldier on the ground while injuring another.

15 JulyA Republic of China Air Force Northrop F-5F (5410) from the 7th Tactical Fighter Group based at Ching Chuan Kang Air Base crashes on a routine training flight of the coast of Penghu, Taiwan killing the 2 crew.

16 JulyA Pakistan Air Force Lockheed Martin F-16A Fighting Falcon, 92729, on a routine night training exercise from No. 9 Squadron from Mushaf Airbase crashes 105 km south-west of Sargodha, Pakistan resulting in the death of the pilot, Squadron Leader Saud Ghulam Nabi. Another source gives the accident date as 17 July.

17 July
A Fuerza Aérea Venezolana Cessna T206H (FAV-2807) flying from Puerto Ayacucho to La Esmeralda, Estado Amazonas, Venezuela crashes into the hillside of El Duida,  from its destination at La Esmeralda airport, killing the 3 crew members.

18 JulyA United States Air Force McDonnell Douglas F-15E Strike Eagle from the 336th Fighter Squadron, based at Seymour Johnson AFB, North Carolina, flying in support of ISAF coalition operations, crashed in eastern Afghanistan. The two aircrew, Capt. Thomas J. Gramith and Capt. Mark R. McDowell both died in the incident.

19 JulyA People's Liberation Army Air Force Xian JH-7 (FBC-1 Flying Leopard) crashes near the Taonan tactical training base in Jilin province while on a joint counter-terrorism exercises with Russia resulting in the death of 2 crew.

20 July
A Royal Air Force Panavia Tornado GR.4 operating with RAF No. 1 Squadron crashes on take-off at Kandahār International Airport in Afghanistan and the two crew members successfully eject from the aircraft.

20 JulyA Chilean Air Force Extra 300L aerobatic aircraft cashed 15 km south of Santiago, Chile, pilot seriously injured.

20 JulyAn IAI Kfir jet fighter crashes near the city of Cartagena, Colombia. The Israeli pilots operating the aircraft were unharmed in the incident, but the jet itself was destroyed. Israel Aerospace Industries said in a statement that the aircraft was flying a refresher flight, and that the aircraft did not come to a stop on the landing strip, landing outside it. The director of the Israel Aerospace Industries announced that an investigation into the incident had already begun and that a panel to probe the crash had been appointed.

21 JulyA United States Navy Sikorsky HH-60H 163790 crashed on a training flight at Fort Pickett, Blackstone, Virginia, United States; minor injuries only.

23 JulyA Turkish Air Force McDonnell Douglas F-4 Phantom II crashes on take-off after from the Erhaç Air Base in Malatya, Turkey due to a technical fault caused by drop-tank falling from the aircraft. The two crew members successfully eject from the aircraft and were hospitalized after the incident.

23 JulyAn Uzbekistan Air and Air Defence Forces Mil Mi-24 Hind Helicopter on a routine training exercise crashes near the airport of Chirchiq, Tashkent Province, Uzbekistan killing the 2 crew.

31 JulyAn Indian Air Force HAL HPT-32 Deepak a prop-driven primary military trainer crashes in the Medak district of the Andhra Pradesh state killing the 2 crew.

5 AugustA Pakistan Air Force Chengdu FT-7 crashes near Attock, northwest Pakistan, killing the pilot.

6 AugustA Swedish Air Force Saab JAS 39 Gripen C from Blekinge Wing (F 17) suffered a heavy landing at Ronneby Airport, Sweden caused by the failure of the under-carriage to operate after a fire alarm was trigged and the pilot was uninjured in the incident.

16 AugustTwo Russian Knights air display Sukhoi Su-27 jets collide whilst training, killing one pilot, Igor Tkachenko, and injuring several civilians on the ground. The accident occurred near Zhukovsky Airfield, outside of Moscow.

16 AugustAn Islamic Republic of Iran Air Force Bell 214ST crashed on a training flight near Karaj, Iran, four killed.

19 AugustA United States Army Sikorsky UH-60 Black Hawk from Fort Campbell, Kentucky the home base of the 101st Airborne, crashes while on a training exercise being carried-out by the 160th Special Operations Aviation Regiment (Airborne). The accident occurred 400 ft below the summit of the 14,421 feet high (4,268 m) Mount Massive in the Sawatch Range, Colorado leaving 2 crew dead, 1 injured and 1 crew member missing.

21 AugustAn Indian Navy British Aerospace Sea Harrier FRS.51 crashes shortly after take-off from Dabolim Airport near Goa, India. The aircraft on a routine flight crashed into the Arabian Sea of the coast of Goa killing the pilot Lt. Cdr. Saurav Saxena.

27 AugustA Hellenic Air Force PZL-Mielec M-18 Dromader fire-fighting aircraft from the 359 Public Services Air Support Unit based at Andravida Airforce Base crashes after hitting high-voltage cables. The accident occurred while fighting a forest fire in the village of Katseli near Argostoli, Kefalonia, Greece resulting in the death of the pilot.

28 AugustA United States Air Force Boeing E-3C Sentry, 83-0008, (AEW&C) while returning from the Red Flag Exercise 09–5 with the 552d Air Control Wing from Tinker Air Force Base, Oklahoma, makes a landing at Nellis Air Force Base. Due to a fire the aircraft was damaged and the crew of 32 were safely evacuated and the fire extinguished by Nellis AFB emergency response crew.

30 AugustA Belarusian Air Force Sukhoi Su-27 Flanker was lost during Radom Airshow 2009, Poland. The aircraft crashed near the Małęczyn village, outside the military air base the event took place on. No civilian was injured. There was no damage reported on the ground. The crew of two did not eject and were found dead by the rescue teams.

7 SeptemberAn Indonesian Air Force Government Aircraft Factories Nomad P837 on a routine flight crashes near a local village of Sekatak Matadau, Bulungan district in East Kalimantan killing 4 of the 9 passengers and crew.

10 SeptemberA Spanish Air Force Dassault Mirage F1 crashes in the Cazorla Natural Park, near Jaén, Spain, while in a training flight. The pilot ejected and suffered minor injuries.

10 SeptemberAn Armada de México Bell 406 Helicopter on a routine patrol crashes near the 27 kilometre post on the Perote-Los Humeros Highway, Veracruz State, Mexico, resulting in 2 crew injured and 3 fatalities.

12 SeptemberAn Indian Air Force Mikoyan MiG-21 Bison from the Bhatinda Airforce Station, Punjab, India crashed due to a technical fault near the village of Muktsar-Bhatinda in the Punjab Provence, Pakistan killing the pilot.

13 SeptemberAn Israeli Air Force Lockheed Martin F-16A Fighting Falcon 140, from the Nevatim Israeli Air Force Base, Beersheba, Israel crashes near the P'nei Chever settlement in the Southern Hebron Hills at 1345 hrs. killing the pilot. The incident occurred during military training including a simulated dogfight with another aircraft. During a sharp turn, the pilot Captain Assaf Ramon the son of Colonel Ilan Ramon who died in the Space Shuttle Columbia disaster in 2003, suffered either loss of consciousness or mechanical failure leading to the crash.

17 SeptemberAn Indonesian Air Force FFA AS-202 Bravo on a routine training flight crashes into a rice field in Sragen, Central Java killing the pilot.

19 SeptemberA United States Army Sikorsky UH-60 Black Hawk crashed at Joint Base Balad, (formerly Al-Bakr Air Base), Balad, Iraq. The accident occurred during a storm including high winds and a sandstorm resulting in 12 crew injured and 1 fatality.

22 September Islamic Republic of Iran Air Force Ilyushin Il-76MD AWACS aircraft 5-8208 "Simorgh" collides with another Iranian Air Force Northrop F-5E Tiger II during a military parade near Varamin, Iran resulting in 7 fatalities.

24 SeptemberAn Aeronavale test flight involving two Dassault Rafale aircraft flying back to the Aircraft Carrier Charles de Gaulle (R91) collide in mid-air. The incident occurred in the Mediterranean of the coast of Perpignan, Pyrénées-Orientales, France and one pilot was rescued after ejecting from the aircraft the second pilot listed as missing.

28 SeptemberA Japan Maritime Self-Defense Force (JMSDF) NAMC YS-11 a twin-engined turboprop transport crashed while landing at JMSDF Ozuki Air Field in Shimonoseki, Yamaguchi Prefecture, Japan. The landing in light rain, the aircraft suffered an overshoot of the runway and crashed through the airfield perimeter fence, crossing a service road and plunged nose-first into a rice field. The 11 JMSDF crew members of the aircraft were uninjured and the NAMC YS-11 aircraft suffered bent propellers.

2 OctoberA Yemeni Air Force Mikoyan MiG-21 Fishbed crashes during a low-flying exercise due to mechanical failure.

2 OctoberA Fuerza Aérea Mexicana Cessna 182S Skylane (FAM-5498) crashes near San José Querendaro, Michoacán, Mexico. The aircraft on a reconnaissance flight from Morelia Airport crashed in the mountains of Michoacán with 3 crew fatalities.

3 OctoberA Fuerza Aérea Boliviana Aérospatiale Aérospatiale SA 315B Lama Helicopter (FAB-730) from the Escuadrón 511 crashes into a building wall on the Pampa near the city of Cochabamba, Bolivia leaving 4 crew dead, 1 crew member injured 
and 1 civilian on the ground injured.

7 OctoberA Libyan Air Force Mikoyan MiG-23 Flogger crashes while taking part during an airshow for the Third Libyan Aviation Exhibition, LAVEX 2009 held at Mitiga International Airport, Tripoli, Libya. The aircraft travelling at low-level hit a one-storey house in the suburb of Souq Al-Jumaa in Tripoli killing the 2 crew and injuring two civilians.

9 OctoberA Fuerza Aérea Uruguaya EADS CASA C-212-200 Aviocar (FAU-531/UN-146) a twin-engined turboprop transport aircraft, on a reconnaissance flight crashes near Fonds-Verrettes, Ouest, Haiti. The aircraft taking part in the United Nations Stabilization Mission in Haiti crashed into a mountainside near the remote village of Pays-Pourri killing the 11 crew.

12 OctoberAn Irish Air Corps Pilatus PC-9M flying in poor weather conditions crashes at Crumlin East near Cornamona in County Galway, Republic of Ireland killing the flying instructor and cadet pilot.

15 OctoberA United States Air Force Lockheed Martin F-16C Fighting Falcon, 91-0365, is lost while flying on a routine night flying exercise from the 77th Fighter Squadron, 20th Fighter Wing, based at the Shaw Air Force Base, Sumter, South Carolina when it collides mid-air with F-16C 91-0364. The United States Coast Guard commenced a search for a missing aircraft in the North Atlantic of the coast of South Carolina while the second aircraft, piloted by Capt. Lee Bryant, despite damage was able to land at Charleston Air Force Base. on 16 October, Coast Guard searchers found crash debris in the Atlantic Ocean believed to belong to the missing F-16. "The Coast Guard has found some debris in the ocean that is apparently from our missing F-16", said Robert Sexton, the Shaw Air Force Base Public Affairs chief in Sumter, South Carolina. The other pilot, Capt. Nicholas Giglio, is missing. "They have not yet found any sign of the pilot and the search continues", Mr. Sexton said. No one witnessed what happened to Captain Giglio after the collision.

17 OctoberA United States Marine Corps McDonnell Douglas F/A-18D Hornet (164729) from the Marine All Weather Fighter Attack Squadron No. 224 VMFA(AW)-224 based at the Marine Corps Air Station Beaufort, Beaufort, South Carolina experiences a heavy landing at Jacksonville International Airport, Duval County, Florida. The aircraft with two other Marine F/A-18 Hornet aircraft were landing at Jacksonville Airport in preparation for a flyover at the nearby NFL Jacksonville Jaguars game when the aircraft experiences an airborne technical fault and the port landing-gear collapses causing the aircraft to land only on the nose-wheel, starboard undercarriage and the exposed port-side external fuel-tank.  The F/A-18 Hornet skidded down the runway with most damage occurring to the grounded external fuel-tank and the 2 Marine crew were uninjured.

22 OctoberA United States Army Sikorsky UH-60 Black Hawk Helicopter while on a routine training exercise crashes onto the deck of the USNS Arctic off the coast of Fort Story, Virginia Beach, Virginia. The Black Hawk helicopter from the 160th Special Operations Aviation Regiment (Airborne) was on a joint exercise with the United States Navy SEALs and was practising fast maritime interdiction by rappelling by rope to the ship's deck when the accident occurred killing 1 crew and injuring a further 8 service personnel.

23 OctoberAn Indian Air Force Mikoyan MiG-27 flying from the Hasimara Air Force Base, Eastern Air Command crashes near New Jalpaiguri, West Bengal, India. The aircraft on a routine training exercise suffers a technical fault and an on-board engine fire shortly after take-off. After a successful ejection the pilot parachutes into a nearby tea estate and the aircraft crashes into a nearby river bank injuring two children.

29 OctoberA Força Aérea Brasileira Cessna 208  FAB-2725 flying from Cruzeiro do Sul, Acre to Tabatinga crash lands in the Ituí River a small tributary of the Rio Javari, Amazonas State.  The twin-engined turboprop aircraft of the 7º Esquadrão de Transporte Aéreo from Base Aérea de Manaus was transporting officials from Brazilian Ministry of Health participating in a vaccination programme when the aircraft crashed landed between the Amazonian villages of Aurelius and New River. The aircraft was later found by indigenous villagers of the region discovering 9 survivors and 2 dead crew.

29 OctoberA United States Coast Guard Lockheed HC-130H-7 Hercules, USCG 1705, from Coast Guard Air Station Sacramento, California, collides with a United States Marine Corps Bell AH-1W SuperCobra Attack Helicopter, BuNo 164596, of HMLA-469,  E of San Clemente Island, off of the coast of Southern California, killing all seven Coast Guard aircrew and both Marine aircrew.

6 NovemberA Russian Naval Aviation Tupolev Tu-142 M3 from the 310th Independent Long Range Anti-Submarine Aviation Regiment based at Kamenny Ruchey Airbase crashes 15–20 km from the coast of Cape Datta north of Sovetskaya Gavan. The Naval aircraft on a routine training exercise crashes into the sea in the Tatar Strait near the island of Sakhalin with the loss of all 11 crew.

23 NovemberAn Aeronautica Militare Italiana Lockheed Martin C-130J Hercules, MM62176, engaged in a training mission crashes on nearby train tracks bordering the Pisa airport, while climbing and performing a left turn immediately after take-off from Galileo Galilei Airport. The aircraft immediately burst into flames, killing its five-member crew.

27 NovemberA Sri Lanka Air Force Mil Mi-24 Helicopter (CH635) engaged on a training mission, crashed 5 km north of Buttala(310 km south-east of Colombo) at approximately 1330 HRS due to technical failure. Prior to the crash the pilot have reported a power failure to the tail rotor. Pilot, Co-Pilot and 2 door gunners died in this incident.

30 NovemberAn Indian Air Force Sukhoi Su-30MKI crashes near Jethagaon in Jaisalmer of Rajasthan after it took off from Jodhpur, crash happened while returning from a regular training mission, both pilots are safe.

8 DecemberA Japan Maritime Self-Defense Force Sikorsky HH-60H Seahawk Helicopter crashed and sank off the coast of Nagasaki. Two crewmembers were killed, while a third was rescued.

16 DecemberPakistan Air Force Dassault Mirage III fighter aircraft crashed during a training mission due to a technical fault. The pilot managed to eject safely, landing in the Durrab Lake, (Kallar Kahar) and was rescued by a boat.

23 DecemberRoyal Thai Air Force Northrop F-5E 21118/91681 from 211 Sq. crashed in Thailand. Pilot Chatchawan Rassamee died.

See also
List of accidents and incidents involving the Lockheed C-130 Hercules
Lists of accidents and incidents involving military aircraft

References

External links
 AVIATION WEEK
 PlaneCrashInfo.com

2000